XXXIV Brigade, Royal Field Artillery was a brigade of the Royal Field Artillery which served in the First World War.

It was originally formed with 22nd, 50th and 70th Batteries, and attached to 2nd Infantry Division. On 5 August 1914, it was mobilised  and was sent to the Continent with the British Expeditionary Force, where it saw service with 2nd Division until 1917.  It went to France commanded by Lt Col H G Sandilands, with Capt H G Boone as adjutant, and Arthur Stoyle as RSM. 22nd Battery was commanded by Major H T Wynter; 50th Battery by Major T O Seagram; 70th Battery by Major H C S Clarke; the newly formed Ammunition Column was commanded by Captain D Stewart.

22nd Battery left the Brigade to  Feb 1915, joining 3rd Brigade RFA in 28th Division (later serving on the Salonika front). 56th (Howitzer) Battery joined the brigade in May 1916, when the Ammunition Column moved to be part of 2nd DAC. In November 1916 521st Howitzer Battery joined the Brigade from England, briefly serving as  D/34th.

On 25 January 1917, 34th Brigade left 2nd Division to become an army-level artillery brigade; D/34th was broken up - a section joining  D/36th Brigade and the other 47/41st Brigade, its men remaining with 2nd Division.  A new C/34th was added, previously A/60th Brigade RFA, and a new Brigade Ammunition Column under Captain C H Putnam.

In November 1918 34th Army Brigade RFA was  serving with Third Army, still with 50th Bty, 70th Bty, C/34th and 56th (Howitzer) Bty.

Notes

External links
Royal Field Artillery Brigades
2nd Division Order of Battle

References

Royal Field Artillery brigades
Artillery units and formations of World War I